Vazhithala is a village in Idukki district in the state of Kerala, India.

References

Villages in Idukki district